Monticchiello is a village in Tuscany, central Italy, administratively a frazione of the comune of Pienza, province of Siena. At the time of the 2001 census its population was 213.

Monticchiello is about 60 km from Siena and 8 km from Pienza.

References 

Frazioni of the Province of Siena
Pienza